Paul Barbeau is a film producer who lives in Montreal, Quebec.

Director of independent films and Producer of films Romeo Eleven, The Lodge and Pieces of a Woman.

Barbeau produced more than 700 music videos for international artists such as (Celine Dion, Arcade Fire, Daniel Lanois, Tragically Hip) with NúFilms which he founded with Bernard Nadeau, Stéphane Raymond and Jean-Francois Lord in May 2000. After several MuchMusic Video Awards, Victoires de la Musique and Grammy Award nominations, NuFilms ends production due to the financial impacts of illegal downloading of music during Napster's surge and prominence. This inspires him to write and direct his 1st feature, Après la neige, which premiered at the Shanghai International Film Festival.

Under Reprise Films, Barbeau produces six Canadian features including Demain and Jo for Jonathan) directed by Maxime Giroux, with the latter having its world premiere at the 2010 Locarno International Film Festival. Roméo Onze directed by Ivan Grbovic, World premiered at the Karlovy Vary International Film Festival in 2011  and in 2013, he completed Sébastien Rose's film Before My Heart Falls, which premiered at International Film Festival Rotterdam.

His 2nd film as writer/director is À nous l'éternité premiered in Official Competition at the Mannheim-Heidelberg International Film Festival (IFFMH) also winning Best Director award at the Tallahassee Film Festival.

His third feature, We Had It Coming'', had its International premiere at the Prague International Film Festival in 2020. Starring Natalie Krill, recipient of the Stars to Watch prize at the Whistler Film Festival.

In recent years, Barbeau's focus has mainly shifted from Directing to Producing star-driven American feature films.

Notes

External links
 

Film producers from Quebec
French Quebecers
Living people
Canadian music video directors
Film directors from Montreal
Year of birth missing (living people)